The Minister for State Development was a minister in the New South Wales Government that sought to attract new investment into the State and to identify opportunities for existing NSW businesses, through providing services to the business sector and co-ordination services to the public sector to develop an internationally competitive economy in New South Wales.

The portfolio was abolished in 2011 with the formation of the O'Farrell ministry and its responsibilities were split between the portfolios of Trade and Investment and Regional Infrastructure and Services.

List of ministers

See also 

List of New South Wales government agencies

References

State Development